Quchapampa (Quechua qucha lake, pampa a large plain, "lake plain", Hispanicized spelling Ccochabamba, Jocha Pampa) is a lake in Peru located in the Ayacucho Region, Lucanas Province, Aucara District. It is situated at a height of about  near Aucará.

References

Lakes of Peru
Lakes of Ayacucho Region